Sexualization in child beauty pageants has been the topic of controversy and debate. Since all contestants for child beauty pageants are minors, there are concerns regarding the potential long-term negative impacts early sexualization can have on these children's psyche. The negative impacts can effect the contestant's self-esteem and relationship with their own bodies throughout their lives due to hyperfixation on achieving flawless adult aesthetics at a young age. In more extreme cases, the psychological impacts of early sexualization in pageants can lead to various psychological disorders such as depression, anxiety disorder, and various eating disorders. However, there is also support of children competing in beauty pageants due to the way they challenge children to have more confidence in order to able to compete successfully in these pageants.

Background 
There are several components to sexualization that set it apart from healthy sexuality. Sexualization occurs when a person's value comes only from their sexual appeal or behavior, to the exclusion of other characteristics. A report by the American Psychological Association more specifically cites sexuality that is imposed on someone, rather than undertaken by choice, as evidence of sexualization. In the United States, legal adulthood and ability to give consent varies from 16 to 18 years of age, yet in child beauty pageants, the children's consenting parents permit them to participate, pay their entry fees, dress them, and train them to perform on stage in front of judges and an audience.

As Vernon R. Wiehe, a professor in the University of Kentucky College of Social Work, states, "sexualization occurs through little girls wearing adult women's clothing in diminutive sizes, the use of makeup which often is applied by makeup consultants, spray tanning the body, the dying of hair and the use of hair extensions, and assuming provocative postures more appropriate for adult models". Many views the child's appearance as obscene or inappropriate.

In preparation for these beauty pageants, children have their appearances altered by costumes, makeup, and other products, which objectifies them at a very young age. The child perceives that sexuality is not only encouraged but can be a means to an end. The child pageant industry involves thousands of contestants and $5 billion a year in revenue, and television networks air in-demand shows like Toddlers & Tiaras and Little Miss Perfect. The viewership implies that many adults not only condone these activities but also view children as sexual objects.

Bikini contests of minors
Miss Tanguita, which translates as "Miss Little Thong", is held in Barbosa, Santander, Colombia as an annual part of the "del Rio Suarez" Festival. Activists say that the competition, though legal, abuses the human rights of minors.

Beginning in 2016, the Miss Teen USA pageant removed the swimsuit competition and replaced it with an athleticwear round.

Training for beauty pageants 
The training for child beauty pageant competitors includes long hours and strict daily routines. During training periods, the children are often pushed beyond their limits and denied necessary rest. Parents can pay for private coaching, teach their children themselves, or enroll their children in pageant schools. Although these children are working long hours throughout the week for the financial gain of their parents, Child labour laws in the United States do not apply to them and the practice remains mostly unregulated.

Support for participation 
Despite criticism of child beauty pageants, contestants' parents continue to argue for the positive impact these competitions have on their children's personal development. Supporters often cite self-confidence and poise as attributes that children learn during the pageant process, and still more defend pageants as being similar to other athletic, music, or educational programs. Since young girls like playing dress up and enjoy participating in beauty pageants, they argue, they are positive events. The Pageant Director for the Cities of America preliminary pageant system echoes these sentiments and argues that pageants are good for girls—they develop self-confidence by actively trying to be a part of something, they compete with others through a fair process, and they enjoy meeting others with similar interests. Being able to communicate and network with others is an important skill that children learn at a young age when participating in beauty pageants. Through pageants, children also learn how to communicate with adults.

One pageant mother insists that pageants have helped her daughter "gain poise, confidence, showmanship, discipline and grace." This may be true for some contestants, as the child's attitude typically derives from the parent. When the parents embrace a positive attitude, the children will follow. In these cases, pageants can teach children how to be gracious winners and good losers. They will learn the aspects of rules and fair play. Thus, pageants teach children how to be calm, cool, and collected in front of crowds. Supporters believe participants learn tenacity when they fail and must move on, and they practice arduously trying to achieve something which proves even more valuable when they are successful.

From some child contestants' perspectives, pageants are fun and a way to make new friends, and they are able to feel good about their friends winning.

Criticism of sexualization in child pageants
There is a wide scope of criticisms regarding the participation of children in beauty pageants. A writer for the New York Times criticized child beauty pageants because participants and viewers impose adulthood on children while still expecting them to radiate innocence. The appeal of child beauty pageants in this context is the simultaneous existence of adult sexuality and childhood innocence in the contestants.

In 1996, footage of 6-year-old JonBenét Ramsey was broadcast on television across the U.S. of her performing onstage wearing a skimpy outfit with full makeup and hair during a child beauty pageant—viewers felt as if they were watching "child pornography". However, the coverage of her murder investigation became a public spectacle due to the surrounding scandal regarding her hypersexuality in her pageant performances. The scandal marked one of the first instances of the public questioning the practices that take place in child beauty pageants, as the discourse around her adult and sexualized image played a key role in her trials.

Children develop a sense of sexual identity during the ages of adolescence and sexualization makes this task more during their youth. When parents enter their child into beauty competitions they are encouraging their children to engage in behaviors and practices that are socially associated with sexiness. With popularity of similar child beauty pageant television shows like Toddlers & Tiaras, the public is concerned that young contestants are being displayed as objects of sexual desire to their audience. Reality shows such as Toddlers & Tiaras reinforce the dominant perception of women's worth being inherently and directly linked to their sexual desirability. The reality shows that document the journey of young children through pageant competitions are centred around the physical transformation of the contestants from a typical childish aesthetic to a mature woman's aesthetic. Through observing and learning from the way their environment praises these physical transformations, child contestants in these pageants come to learn that their gender identity is a performed concept and the more sexual, mature, and feminine this performance is, the more they are succeeding in performing womanhood.

Children are in “Child Beauty Pageants” only because of their age. These children are judged along with the same criteria as an adult pageant woman would be judged on. Since the children are aware that their performance is expected to be the portrayal of adult womanhood, it indirectly teaches them that womanhood cannot exist without sexuality. The indirect lessons impact the mindset of young girls in the long term due to its implications regarding gender performance.  

There is controversy around the Glitz Child Beauty Pageants due to contestants dramatically enhancing their appearances and provocative performances. Performances and image alterations like the ones displayed in glitz pageants encourage young contestants to believe that having glitz beauty is the only way to gain success in both their pageant and non-pageant lives. Due to the way these pageants are set up so children are directly competing against other children, children come to understand that it is obligatory for them to perform adult "sexiness" in order to receive positive attention and praise from their own parents.

Consequences of child sexualization in child pageants
In reports of children being sexually abused, research shows that the sexualization of children is a contributing factor to their abuse. Also, if the child is winning constantly in a competition that is based primarily on her looks, she is more likely to develop psychological issues later on in life, such as depression, low self-esteem, and eating disorders. There is also a link to lowered sexual efficacy and contraceptive use later in life.

"'Some critics contend that the child beauty pageant culture fails to acknowledge that "sexualized images of little girls may have dangerous implications in a world where 450,000 American children were reported as victims of sexual abuse in 1993."

The hyper attention and judgement towards children's physical appearance in child beauty pageants increases the risk of the child developing various forms of eating disorders. Some of these eating disorders that have long lasting physiological and psychological impacts include Anorexia and Bulimia.

The psychological problems related to perceptions of the self are long lasting and carry onto adolescence and adulthood due to the hyper fixation on the children's physical appearance at an early age. The implications regarding the achievement of "perfection" and the perception of body image that have been taught to these children remain engrained in the way they view themselves long after they retire from pageant competitions and transition into adulthood. Since mothers are usually the parent that is emotionally involved in their child's participation in pageants, there's a lot of information regarding their outlook on the contests. Some of the immense pressure that is put on child beauty pageant contestants are attributed to the overcompensation of pageant moms due to their own insecurities. As a result of these mother's constant pushing, many of these young girls feel as if they let their mothers down by failing to achieve the unattainable standards of beauty and sexuality that is set for them. 

In France, after a 10-year-old girl was featured on the cover of Vogue Paris in an inappropriate outfit- not fit for a child, lawmakers banned child beauty pageants all together. The ban took the form of an amendment to the already established women's rights law and condemned all these pageants for violating children's equal rights due to their objectification in child beauty pageant competitions.

References

Child sexual abuse
Sexualization
Child beauty pageants
Beauty pageant controversies
Pedophilia